Billiards at the 2017 Summer Universiade was held in the Expo Dome, Taipei Expo Park, Taipei City, Taiwan, from August 25 to 29, 2017. Four competitions were held in men's and women's single 9-ball and in men and women's team 9-ball. Due to its status as a demonstration sport, the medals won in this sport event will be awarded, but will not be computed in the overall medal table.

Participating nations

 (H)

Medal table

Medalists

References

External links 
2017 Summer Universiade – Billiards
Result book – Billiards

2017 Summer Universiade events
2017 in cue sports
Cue sports at the Summer Universiade
 
Cue sports in Taiwan